Extraterrestrial: The First Sign of Intelligent Life Beyond Earth (also known as Extraterrestrial) is a popular science book written by American theoretical physicist and Harvard University astronomer Avi Loeb, published by Houghton Mifflin Harcourt on 26 January 2021.

Contents
The book describes the 2017 detection of Oumuamua, the first known interstellar object to pass through the Solar System. Loeb, an astronomer at Harvard University, speculates that the object might be an extraterrestrial artifact, a suggestion considered unlikely by the scientific community collectively. Earlier, Loeb claimed to have demonstrated that the interstellar object was not an asteroid, was moving too fast in a very unusual orbit and left no gas trail or debris in its path to be a comet. Loeb believes, due to the observed acceleration of the object near the sun, that Oumuamua may be a thin disk that acts as a solar sail. Further, Loeb and colleagues demonstrated that the object is unlikely to be frozen hydrogen, as proposed by other researchers.

Elizabeth Kolbert of The New Yorker magazine summarized the reasoning used by Avi Loeb about Oumuamua as follows:

Besides Oumuamua, another interstellar object, the comet 2I/Borisov, has been detected passing through the Solar System. In comparison, 2I/Borisov has been found to be natural, whereas Oumuamua has not been so determined. The possibility that Oumuamua may be alien technology has not been ruled out, although such an explanation is considered unlikely by most scientists. Nonetheless, according to Loeb, "We should be open-minded and search for evidence rather than assume that everything we see in the sky must be rocks."

Reviews
Alan Lightman writes the book is "provocative and thrilling," and commends Loeb for suggesting that readers "think big and to expect the unexpected." Jeff Foust, editor and publisher of The Space Review, comments that Loeb "fails to close the case that the object must be artificial ... Just because something can’t be immediately explained by natural phenomena doesn't mean it’s not natural". Further, "Perhaps Oumuamua will turn out to be the first of many in a new class of interstellar objects with an unusual, but natural, origin. Or, maybe, it will be like the “Wow!” signal, which was never seen again and its source never identified; mysterious, but not necessarily alien". Dennis Overbye, science writer for The New York Times, notes that the book is, "part graceful memoir and part plea for keeping an open mind about the possibilities of what is out there in the universe — in particular, life. Otherwise, he says, we might miss something amazing, like the church officials in the 17th century who refused to look through Galileo’s telescope." Reviewing for The New Yorker, Elizabeth Kolbert writes, "It seems a good deal more likely that [the book] will be ranked with von Däniken's work than with Galileo's," but concedes "it's thrilling to imagine the possibilities."

References

External links
 Official Book WebSite 
 Official Author WebSite

American non-fiction books
Astronomy books
Houghton Mifflin books
Popular science books
2021 non-fiction books